Friday (Original Motion Picture Soundtrack) is the soundtrack to F. Gary Gray's 1995 stoner film Friday. It was released on April 11, 1995 through Priority Records and consists of hip hop and R&B music.

Recording sessions took place at Street Knowledge Recording Studio, Dre's Crib, Digital Shack, Larrabee Sound Studios, Image Recording Studios and Yo Mama's House in Los Angeles, at Digital Services in Houston, at Firehouse Studios in New York, at the Archive in Oakland, at the Plant Studios in California, at Luke Recording Studio in Liberty City, and at Ocean 11 Suite 7. Production was handled by film writers Ice Cube and DJ Pooh, as well as DJ Muggs, the 2 Live Crew, Angela Winbush, Bootsy Collins, Dr. Dre, E-A-Ski & CMT, E-Swift, N.O. Joe, Ralph tha Funky Mexican, Rashad Coes, Roger Troutman and Ronald Isley, with Sam Sneed co-producing the album's lead single "Keep Their Heads Ringin'", and Patricia Charbonnet and Toby Emmerich serving as executive producers.

It features appearances from film star Ice Cube, Bernie Worrell, Bootsy Collins, CJ Mac, Cypress Hill, Dr. Dre, E-A-Ski, Funkdoobiest, Mack 10, Nancy Fletcher, Rick James, Roger Troutman, Rose Royce, Scarface, Tha Alkaholiks, The Isley Brothers, Threat, and the 2 Live Crew.

The soundtrack reached No. 1 on the Billboard 200, where it held the position for 2 weeks, and the Top R&B/Hip-Hop Albums chart for 6 weeks. It also spawned the successful Dr. Dre single "Keep Their Heads Ringin'", which made it to No. 10 on the Billboard Hot 100 and No. 1 on the Hot Rap Tracks chart. The album was certified double platinum by the Recording Industry Association of America on June 4, 1996. Music videos were shot for "Friday" and "Keep Their Heads Ringin'".

The title track sparked a feud with the hip hop group Cypress Hill, who claimed that Ice Cube had asked for permission to use their track "Throw Your Set in the Air" and had made a very similar track after being denied permission.

Critical reception

AllMusic's Stephen Thomas Erlewine wrote: "the soundtrack to a lightweight comedy co-written by Ice Cube, the record conveys all the strengths of hit urban radio. Keeping all the good elements of the format -- including the G-funk of Dr. Dre, old-school soul, contemporary R&B, and gangsta rap -- the record sounds like a "Best of the '90s" collection". James Bernard of Entertainment Weekly wrote: "No surprises here. Dr. Dre rumbles over his smooth, insistent groove ("Keep Their Heads Ringin'"), Ice Cube sounds angry ("Friday"), Cypress Hill is still obsessed with pot, and E-A-Ski, a Bay Area hip-hop artist, contributes the gun-happy "Blast If I Have To". Throw in Rick James and Isley Brothers classics and you've got a listening experience that's familiar and fun". Rolling Stone reviewer wrote: "accompanying the new comedy penned by Ice Cube and partner D.J. Pooh, FRIDAY....[is a] righteous set".

Accolades

Track listing

Sample credits
Track 1 contains elements from "Last Tango in Paris" written and performed by Gato Barbieri and "The Bertha Butt Boogie Part 1" written by Jimmy Castor and John Pruitt and performed by the Jimmy Castor Bunch
Track 2 contains elements from "Funk You Up" written by Angela Brown, Cheryl Cook, Gwendolyn Chisolm and Sylvia Robinson and performed by The Sequence
Track 4 contains elements from "So Funkdafied" written by Jermaine Dupri, Chris Jasper, Ernie Isley, Marvin Isley, O'Kelly Isley Jr., Ronald Isley and Rudolph Isley and performed by Da Brat

10th anniversary edition bonus disc
Priority Records released the album Old School Friday on 2 MAY 1995. 

In 2005, on the tenth anniversary of Friday, Priority Records released an eleven-track bonus disc entitled Old School Friday (More Music from the Original Motion Picture) alongside the original soundtrack. It was composed of nine songs, which appeared in the film, plus two songs — "The Chase" and "Hangin' in the Hood" — by Hidden Faces, which were not in the movie.

Other songs
Two songs did appear in the film but were not released on any soundtrack: "Hittin' Corners" written by Darrel Johnson and Shaquil Taja-Allah and performed by K-Dee, and "Control" written by Jimmy Jam and Terry Lewis and performed by Janet Jackson.

Personnel
Performers

O'Shea "Ice Cube" Jackson – performer (track 1), additional vocals (track 8)
Andre "Dr. Dre" Young – performer (track 2)
Nancy Fletcher – performer (track 2)
Barbara Wilson – additional vocals (track 2)
Dorothy Coleman – additional vocals (track 2)
Brad "Scarface" Jordan – performer (track 3)
Bryaan "CJ Mac" Ross – performer (track 3)
Corey "Threat" Lloyd – performer (track 4)
Louis "B-Real" Freese – performer (track 5)
Senen "Sen Dog" Reyes – additional vocals (track 5)
Dedrick "Mack 10" Rolison – performer (track 6)
The Isley Brothers – performer (track 7)
William "Bootsy" Collins – performer (track 8)
Bernie Worrell – performer (track 8)
Rick James – performer (track 9)
Rose Royce – performers (track 10)
Jason "Son Doobie" Vasquez – performer (track 11)
Tyrone "Tomahawk Funk" Pacheco – additional vocals (track 11)
Rico "Tash" Smith – performer (track 12)
James "J-Ro" Robinson – performer (track 12)
Shon "E-A-Ski" Adams – performer & producer (track 13)
The 2 Live Crew – performers (track 14)
Roger Troutman – performer & producer (track 15)
Stewart "Fingas"/"Stu-B-Doo" Bullard – keyboards (track 2)
Preston Middleton – bass (track 3)

Production

Ice Cube – producer
Dr. Dre – producer (track 2)
Joseph "N.O. Joe" Johnson – producer (track 3)
Mark "DJ Pooh" Jordan – producer (track 4)
Rashad Coes – producer (track 4)
Larry "DJ Muggs" Muggerud – producer (tracks: 5, 11)
Ronald Isley – producer (track 7)
Angela Winbush – producer (track 7)
Bootsy Collins – producer (track 8)
Ralph "Tha Funky Mexican" Medrano – producer (track 11)
Eric "E-Swift" Brooks – producer (track 12)
Mark "CMT" Ogleton – producer & mixing (track 13)
David "Mr. Mixx" Hobbs – producer (track 14)
Roger Troutman – producer (track 15)
Samuel "Sam Sneed" – co-producer (track 2)
Luther Campbell – executive producer (track 14)
Patricia Charbonnet – executive producer
Toby Emmerich – executive producer
Andrew M. Shack – co-executive producer

Technical

Dennis Poore – sample clearances (tracks: 1, 2, 4)
Madeleine Smith – sample clearances (tracks: 1, 2, 4)
Mark Spier – sample clearances (tracks: 1, 2, 4)
Keston Wright – engineering (tracks: 1, 2, 6, 8)
Tommy D. Daugherty – engineering (track 2)
Mike Dean – mixing (track 3)
Flip – engineering (track 3)
DJ Pooh – mixing (track 4)
Dave Aron – engineering (track 4)
Rick Freeman – engineering (track 4)
Jason Roberts – engineering (tracks: 5, 11), mixing (track 5)
DJ Muggs – mixing (tracks: 5, 11)
Conley Abrams – recording & mixing (track 7)
Angela Winbush – mixing (track 7)
Nolan Moffitte – engineering (track 12)
Ken Lewis – mixing (track 12)
Steve "Fred 40 to the Head" Fredrickson – recording (track 12)
CMT – engineering & mixing (track 13)
E-A-Ski – engineering & mixing (track 13)
Tom Luekens – engineering (track 13)
Tommy Afont – engineering (track 14)
Ted Stein – engineering & mixing (track 14)
Brian "Big Bass" Gardner – mastering
Frank Fitzpatrick – music supervisor
Nicola Goode – photography
Lee Young – legal representation for Ghetto Bird Productions
Nina Shaw – legal representation for Ghetto Bird Productions

Charts

Weekly charts

Year-end charts

Certifications

See also
List of Billboard 200 number-one albums of 1995
List of Billboard number-one R&B albums of 1995

References

External links

G-funk soundtracks
Hip hop soundtracks
1995 soundtrack albums
EMI Records soundtracks
Gangsta rap soundtracks
Friday (franchise) music
Albums produced by DJ Pooh
Albums produced by Dr. Dre
Albums produced by E-A-Ski
Albums produced by DJ Muggs
Albums produced by Mr. Mixx
Albums produced by N.O. Joe
1990s film soundtrack albums
Contemporary R&B soundtracks
Priority Records soundtracks
Albums produced by Ronald Isley
Albums produced by Angela Winbush
Albums produced by Bootsy Collins
Albums produced by Roger Troutman